The Pulwama district is located to the south of Srinagar in Indian-administered Kashmir. Its district headquarters are situated in the city of Pulwama. It is located in the central part of the Kashmir Valley.

Administration
In 1979 Anantnag district split in two, with one part remaining as Anantnag district, and the other part becoming Pulwama district. When created, Pulwama district had 550 villages, grouped in five subdistricts (tehsils): Shopian, Awantipora, Pampore, Pulwama, and Tral. After Shopian district was created in 2007, Pulwama district had 331 villages and four subdistricts.

Pulwama district currently has eight subdistricts,  with 327 villages (eight of which are uninhabited):

Tehsils
The Pulwama district contains eight tehsils:
 Awantipora Tehsil
 Pampore Tehsil
 Pulwama Tehsil
 Tral Tehsil
 Rajpora Tehsil
 Aripal Tehsil
 Shahoora (Litter) Tehsil
 KakaporaTehsil

This district consists of five development blocks: Tral, Keller, Pampore, Pulwama and Kakapora. Each block consists of a number of panchayats.

Demographics
According to the 2011 census Pulwama district has a population of 560,440, roughly equal to the nation of Solomon Islands or the US state of Wyoming. This gives it a ranking of 537th in India (out of a total of 640).
Its population growth rate over the decade 2001–2011 was 29.18%. Pulwama has a sex ratio of 912 females for every 1000 males (though this varies with religion), and is lower than the national average of 940, and a literacy rate of 64.3%.

At the time of the 2011 census, 91.30% of the population spoke Kashmiri, 3.96% Gojri, 1.38% Punjabi and 1.25% Hindi as their first language.

Healthcare

District has got one of the best health care system in The State/Union Territory. District has 1 DNB Deemed District Hospital Pulwama , 3 Sub-District Hospitals and numerous other health institutions. One tertiary Healthcare institute is under construction in Awantipora Tehsil of the district. It will be the largest hospital in Kashmir province/division.

Transport
District Pulwama is well connected with various transport modes.

National Highway 44 and National Highway 444 pass through Pulwama District.

There are 4 railways stations and 1 halt station located in the district. The district railway Headquarter is located at Awantipora Railway Station.

Educational institutions
Some of the notable educational institutions of Pulwama district:
 AIIMS Awantipora, Pulwama
Boys Government Degree College, Pulwama
Islamic University, Pulwama
Women's College, Pulwama
Paramount Institute of Education
Govt. GNM Nursing College, Pulwama
Phoenix Paramedical College, Pulwama
Dolphin Paramedical College, Pulwama

Land use 
The "reporting area" is the area for which data on land use classification are available.

See also
 Anantnag district
 Kulgam district
 Shopian district
 Budgam district

References

External links
 

 
Districts of Jammu and Kashmir